PFAS is an acronym for per- and polyfluoroalkyl substances, a large class of synthetic chemicals

PFAS may also refer to:
 Phosphoribosylformylglycinamidine synthase, an enzyme
 Personal fall arrest system